Cotinga is a biannual peer-reviewed scientific journal of ornithology published by the Neotropical Bird Club. It was established in 1994 and covers the field of neotropical ornithology and bird conservation in South America, Central America from Mexico to Panama, and the islands of the Caribbean. The focus of the journal is on new distributional and temporal information, including new country records, new biological information, particularly on breeding, and new interpretations on taxonomy, particularly descriptions of new taxa. It publishes articles, short notes, and reviews. Articles are published in English, Spanish, or Portuguese, with an abstract in English, Spanish, Portuguese, or French. The current editor-in-chief is George Wallace.

See also 
 List of ornithology journals

References

External links 
 

Journals and magazines relating to birding and ornithology
Publications established in 1994
English-language journals
Biannual journals